This was the first edition of the tournament.

Shuko Aoyama and Ena Shibahara won the title, defeating Christina McHale and Sania Mirza in the final, 7–5, 6–3.

Seeds

Draw

Draw

References

External Links
Main Draw

Tennis in the Land - Doubles
Tennis in Cleveland